Crawford County is a county located in the U.S. state of Indiana.  As of 2020, the population was 10,526.  The county seat is English.

Geography

Much like the rest of Southern Indiana Crawford County is made up of many wooded hills.

Cities and towns
 Alton
 English
 Leavenworth
 Marengo
 Milltown

Unincorporated areas
 Beechwood
 Carefree
 Curby
 Eckerty
 Fredonia
 Grantsburg
 Mifflin
 Riceville
 Riddle
 Sulphur
 Taswell
 West Fork
 Wickliffe

Townships
 Boone
 Jennings
 Johnson
 Liberty
 Ohio
 Patoka
 Sterling
 Union
 Whiskey Run

Major highways
  Interstate 64
  Indiana State Road 37
  Indiana State Road 62
  Indiana State Road 64
  Indiana State Road 66
  Indiana State Road 145
  Indiana State Road 164
  Indiana State Road 237

Adjacent counties
 Orange County  (north)
 Washington County  (northeast)
 Harrison County  (east)
 Meade County, Kentucky  (south)
 Perry County (southwest/CT Boundary)
 Dubois County (west)

National protected area
 Hoosier National Forest (part)

History

Crawford County was formed on January 5, 1818, from land in the Harrison, Orange and Perry counties, prompted by petition of what would become Crawford County's population. Some say it was named for William H. Crawford, who was U.S. Treasury Secretary in 1818. Others say it was named for Col. William Crawford, who fought in the French and Indian War and Revolutionary War, and who was burned and scalped by Indians in 1782 in what is now Wyandot County, Ohio. The county seat was in Leavenworth for several decades but eventually moved to English.

Bands of "White Caps" terrorized the county in the late 1880s, according to a report by Attorney General Louis T. Michener. Blacks and others they disliked were forced out; victims both male and female were severely whipped.

Climate and weather 

Government

The county government is a constitutional body, and is granted specific powers by the Constitution of Indiana, and by the Indiana Code.

County Council: The county council is the fiscal branch of the county government and controls all the spending and revenue collection in the county. Representatives are elected from county districts. The council members serve four-year terms. They are responsible for setting salaries, the annual budget, and special spending. The council also has limited authority to impose local taxes, in the form of an income and property tax that is subject to state level approval, excise taxes, and service taxes.

Board of Commissioners: The executive body of the county is made of a board of commissioners. The commissioners are elected county-wide, in staggered terms, and each serves a four-year term. One of the commissioners, typically the most senior, serves as president. The commissioners are charged with executing the acts legislated by the council, collecting revenue, and managing the day-to-day functions of the county government.

Court: The county maintains a small claims court that can handle some civil cases. The judge on the court is elected to a term of four years and must be a member of the Indiana Bar Association. The judge is assisted by a constable who is also elected to a four-year term. In some cases, court decisions can be appealed to the state level circuit court.

County Officials: The county has several other elected offices, including sheriff, coroner, auditor, treasurer, recorder, surveyor, and circuit court clerk. Each of these elected officers serves a term of four years and oversees a different part of county government. Members elected to county government positions are required to declare a party affiliation and to be residents of the county.

Crawford County is part of Indiana's 9th congressional district and is represented in Congress by Republican Trey Hollingsworth. It is also part of Indiana Senate district 47 and Indiana House of Representatives district 73.

Demographics

As of the 2010 United States Census, there were 10,713 people, 4,303 households, and 2,991 families residing in the county. The racial makeup of the county was 97.4% white, 0.4% American Indian, 0.2% black or African American, 0.2% Asian, 0.1% Pacific islander, 0.6% from other races, and 1.1% from two or more races. Those of Hispanic or Latino origin made up 1.2% of the population. In terms of ancestry, 23.8% were German, 17.4% were Irish, 13.4% were American, and 8.7% were English.

Of the 4,303 households, 30.6% had children under the age of 18 living with them, 54.6% were married couples living together, 9.7% had a female householder with no husband present, 30.5% were non-families, and 25.6% of all households were made up of individuals. The average household size was 2.48 and the average family size was 2.95. The median age was 41.8 years.

The median income for a household in the county was $47,697 and the median income for a family was $46,073. Males had a median income of $36,465 versus $26,005 for females. The per capita income for the county was $18,598. About 17.4% of families and 18.7% of the population were below the poverty line, including 25.0% of those under age 18 and 15.0% of those age 65 or over.

2020 census

See also
 National Register of Historic Places listings in Crawford County, Indiana

References

Sources

External links

 Crawford County Economic Development Office
 Official Crawford County Tourism Site
 CCCN.net The Homepage for Crawford County Indiana
 Indiana State Library County Names List

 
Indiana counties
1818 establishments in Indiana
Populated places established in 1818
Indiana counties on the Ohio River
Sundown towns in Indiana